Maryanaj (also Romanized as Maryānaj; also known as Marjān and Marjāna) is a city in the Central District of Hamadan County, Hamadan Province, Iran. At the 2006 census, its population was 9,442, in 2,518 families.

Name 
The name Maryānaj is derived from Middle Persian *margānag, from Old Persian *margā- plus the suffix -ānag; it is related to the Middle Persian mlw''' (vocalized /marw/) and Parthian mrg (vocalized /marγ‬‬/), both meaning "prairie", and to the Avestan marəγa and Modern Persian مرغ (marğ), both meaning "plant".

In the dialect of Hamadan, the name is pronounced Maryāneh (مریانه), a form influenced by Middle Persian; in the local dialect of Maryanaj itself, the name is pronounced Margāneh'' (مرگانه), an older form influenced by Northwestern Middle Iranian languages.

References

Populated places in Hamadan County
Cities in Hamadan Province